Killarney Gardens is an industrial area of Cape Town with no population or households. It is located about 30 minutes away from the harbour and the airport and situated between the N1, the N7 and Plattekloof roads.

Neighbouring suburbs include Milnerton Rural, Dunoon, Richwood, and Flamingo Vlei.

The ward councillor for the area is Joy McCarthy from the Democratic Alliance.

References

Suburbs of Cape Town